Miss Diva was introduced by Femina to select a candidate to represent the country at Miss Universe (in contrast to Femina Miss India, also owned by Femina, which selects a candidate as a delegate for Miss World).

The first edition of Miss Diva was held at Westin Mumbai Garden City, Mumbai on September 5, 2013. 14 contestants vied for the crown. Manasi Moghe was crowned the winner, Gurleen Grewal 1st Runner Up and Srishti Rana 2nd Runner Up.

As the winner of Miss Diva 2013, Manasi Moghe represented India at Miss Universe 2013 held in Russia where she made it to the Top 10. Gurleen Grewal represented India at Miss International 2013 held in Japan where she did not place. Srishti Rana represented India at Miss Asia Pacific World 2013 held in South Korea where she was crowned the winner.

Final results
Color keys

*Won Top 7 semifinalist spot by winning Miss Digital Title.

Special Awards

Judges
Zeenat Aman - Miss Asia Pacific 1970 and Bollywood actress
Jacqueline Fernandez - Miss Universe Sri Lanka 2006, model and Bollywood actress
Sahar Biniaz - Miss Universe Canada 2012, model and Bollywood actress
Malaika Arora - Model and Bollywood actress
Raveena Tandon - Model and Bollywood actress
Kunal Kapoor - Model and Bollywood actor
Atul Kasbekar - Famous Indian Photographer

Contestants

Contestants notes
 Sushrii Shreya Mishraa later became Femina Miss India United Continent 2015.
 Sukanya Bhattacharya later became Indian Princess Tourism International 2015. 
 Srishti Rana was the finalist of Femina Miss India 2013(Top 5), she was also Runner-up Pond's Femina Miss India Delhi 2013 (Second runner-up).
  Srishti Rana and Yashna Khurana were winners of Miss India Diva 2013 Delhi.
 Jhataleka Malhotra later became Femina Miss India International 2014 
  Shruti Tuli was First finalist of Miss India Diva 2013 Chandigarh.
 Sona Goldar was the winner of Miss India Diva 2013 Kolkata.
 Trishla Chandola was the winner of Miss India Diva 2013 Bangalore.
 Sukanya Bhattacharya was the finalist of Femina Miss India 2013 and awarded MISS DANCING QUEEN.
 Preeti Chauhan was the finalist of I AM She 2012.(Top 10)
 Manasi Moghe was the finalist of Femina Miss India 2013 and awarded MISS ACTIVE Subtitle in PFMI 2013.
 Seep Taneja was the contestant of I AM She 2011.

Crossovers
 Femina Miss India
 2013 - Srishti Rana - (Finalist, Miss Fashion Icon)
 2013 - Manasi Moghe (Miss Active)
 2013 - Sukanya Bhattacharya (Miss Dancing Queen)
 2014 - Jhataleka Malhotra (Femina Miss India International 2014)
 2015 - Sushrii Shreya Mishraa (Femina Miss India United Continent 2015, Miss Rampwalk, Miss Vivacious)
 Indian Princess
 2015 - Sukanya Bhattacharya (Indian Princess Tourism International 2015, Miss Photogenic)
 I Am She - Miss Universe India
 2011 - Seep Taneja
 2011 - Trishla Chandola
 2012 - Preeti Chauhan (Top 10)
 Asian Supermodel India
 2010 - Sushrii Shreya Mishraa (Winner)

References

External links
 Femina Miss India/Miss India Universe Official Website

Femina Miss India
2013 beauty pageants in India